Từ Minh (1855–1906) was a Vietnamese Empress. 

She was the consort of Emperor Dục Đức. 

She became the mother of: 

 Thành Thái, Emperor 1889-1907.

References

1855 births
1906 deaths
Nguyễn dynasty empresses dowager
19th-century Vietnamese women
20th-century Vietnamese women